Lenaghan is an outer northwestern suburb of Newcastle, New South Wales, Australia, located  from Newcastle's central business district. It is part of the City of Newcastle local government area.

Suburbs of Newcastle, New South Wales